Jeon San-hae (born 29 May 1999) is a South Korean footballer currently playing for Yangju Citizen.

Career statistics

Club
.

Notes

References

External links

1999 births
Living people
South Korean footballers
South Korean expatriate footballers
Association football midfielders
Japan Football League players
J3 League players
K3 League players
Ulsan Hyundai FC players
FC Gifu players
Kamatamare Sanuki players
South Korean expatriate sportspeople in Japan
Expatriate footballers in Japan